The Lincoln House Club is a historic building in the Osterville section of Barnstable, Massachusetts.  The 2-3/4 story wood frame Shingle style structure was built in 1899 by the Lincoln Club of Boston, as part of a "fresh air" movement, and occupies a prominent site near the Grand Island Bridge.  The building is distinctive for its tall yet low-angled gable roof with large brackets, within whose gables there are nearly two floors of usable space.  The club used the building as a clubhouse and lodging facility until 1922, when it was sold and converted into a private residence.

The building was listed on the National Register of Historic Places in 1987.

See also
National Register of Historic Places listings in Barnstable County, Massachusetts

References

Cultural infrastructure completed in 1899
Clubhouses on the National Register of Historic Places in Massachusetts
Shingle Style architecture in Massachusetts
Houses in Barnstable, Massachusetts
National Register of Historic Places in Barnstable, Massachusetts
1899 establishments in Massachusetts